Going Back Home is a collaborative studio album by former Dr. Feelgood guitarist Wilko Johnson and the Who lead vocalist Roger Daltrey released in 2014. The album contains versions of songs previously recorded by Johnson and his former band Dr. Feelgood, as well as a version of "Everybody's Carrying a Gun" by Solid Senders, another band of which Johnson was a member.

The album entered the UK Albums Chart at No. 3, making it Daltrey's highest ranking since the Who's album Face Dances (No. 2 in 1981), while Johnson's last major chart success was Dr. Feelgood's live album Stupidity which reached No. 1 in 1976.

Background
Johnson and Daltrey decided to work together after meeting when seated next to each other at an awards ceremony in 2010 and quickly striking up a friendship. Daltrey said, "It turned out we both loved Johnny Kidd & the Pirates. They'd been a big influence on both our bands. That heavy power-trio sound, backing up a singer; it's a British institution. No-one does that better than us."

Johnson was diagnosed with pancreatic cancer in January 2013, but was well enough to press ahead with the collaboration when The Who finished their world tour. Going Back Home was recorded in the space of a week in November 2013. According to Johnson, "Roger jumped up and said, 'Let's do it,'. He knew this lovely little studio called Yellow Fish in Uckfield. Unfortunate name for a place, but a great studio." The album's track listing was revealed on 22 February 2014. It was later established that Johnson actually had a less aggressive neuroendocrine tumour, and following radical surgery he was later declared cancer-free.

Some of the musicians who worked with Johnson and Daltrey on the album were current and past Blockheads members Dylan Howe, Norman Watt-Roy (who also worked on Daltrey's 1984 album Parting Should Be Painless), and the Style Council's former keyboardist Mick Talbot.

Critical reception

At The Oakland Press, Gary Graff rated the album three out of four stars, writing that "If this is indeed Johnson’s last gasp, he’s made it a memorable howl." Edna Gunderson of USA Today rated the album three stars out of four, and remarked: "Do they defy age with a ferocious display of R&B? Roger Wilco that." In his review for Mojo magazine, Mark Blake wrote that "Johnson's chopping rhythm guitar and Daltrey's geezerish growl make perfect bedfellows." Blake described Going Back Home as a "joyful, celebratory affair".

Track listing
All songs written by Wilko Johnson except as noted.

Personnel
 Wilko Johnson - lead guitar
 Roger Daltrey - lead vocals, acoustic guitar
 Norman Watt-Roy - bass guitar
 Dylan Howe - drums, percussion
 Mick Talbot - piano, Hammond organ
 Steve Weston - harmonica

Charts

Weekly charts

Year-end charts

Certifications

References

2014 albums
Roger Daltrey albums
Collaborative albums
Chess Records albums